Bending Spoons S.p.A. is an Italian mobile application developer, founded in 2013 and based in Milan. The company is known primarily for iOS mobile apps, including Splice, 30 Day Fitness, Live Quiz, and Remini. In November 2022, it agreed to acquire Evernote. Bending Spoons is one of the world's leading mobile developers, by number of app downloads.

On 17 April 2020, the Italian government released a statement on its website announcing that Bending Spoons had been selected to design and develop Italy's official COVID-19 contact tracing app, Immuni. Bending Spoons granted the government a perpetual and irrevocable license for Immuni, free of charge. The app was released on 1 June 2020. It was initially released in four regions, then countrywide.

Awards 

 2020: Top 10, Best Workplaces™ in Europe
 2019, 2020: Winner, Best Workplaces™ (50–149 employees) in Italy
 2022: 2nd place, Best Workplaces™ (150–499 employees) in Italy
 2019: Winner, Best Workplaces™ for Women in Italy
 2019, 2020, 2021: Winner, Best Workplaces™ for Millennials in Italy
 2019: 2nd place, Best Workplaces™ for Innovation in Italy

Immuni 
Immuni is Italy's official contact tracing app in the battle against the COVID-19 pandemic. Bending Spoons designed and developed Immuni under the direction of the Special Commissioner for the COVID-19 Emergency, the Ministry of Health, and the Minister for Technological Innovation. Bending Spoons granted the government a perpetual and irrevocable license for Immuni, free of charge.

The Immuni project was announced in a press release on the Italian government website on 17 April 2020. Italy's Prime Minister Giuseppe Conte discussed the Immuni project in a televised press conference on 30 April 2020. Immuni was awarded the maximum five stars by the Massachusetts Institute of Technology’s MIT Technology Review Contact Tracing Tracker in May 2020.

With Immuni, Italy was the first major European nation to launch a contact tracing app, and it received 2.2 million downloads in its first ten days since launching on the App Store and Google Play Store on 1 June 2020.

The name 
In a 2019 interview with Forbes Leader's Talk, Bending Spoons co-founder Luca Ferrari stated:

Other notable activities 
Bending Spoons has published open source libraries on GitHub. As of June 2020, its modern Swift framework "Katana" has received over 2,000 stars.

Bending Spoons runs annual bootcamps for promising students. These include First Ascent International, First Ascent Italy, and First Ascent Business

See also 
 COVID-19 apps

References

External links 
 

Italian companies established in 2013
Companies based in Milan
Software companies of Italy
Privately held companies of Italy